The University of the Philippines College of Law (often referred to as UP Law) is the law school of the University of the Philippines Diliman. Formally established in 1911 in UP Manila, it is the third oldest continually-operating law school in the Philippines. Since 1948, it has been based in UP Diliman in Quezon City, the flagship of the UP System's eight constituent universities. The college also holds extension classes at the Bonifacio Global City campus of UP Diliman in Taguig and the Iloilo City campus of UP Visayas.

UP Law is noted for having produced the largest number of bar topnotchers and maintaining one of the highest bar passing rates among law schools in the Philippines.

History

It was George Malcolm who had first proposed the establishment of the College of Law within the University of the Philippines system. However, the Board of Regents of the University of the Philippines had initially resisted the proposal. Malcolm thus arranged for the Manila YMCA to offer law courses, which commenced in 1910. Malcolm acted as the Secretary of these law courses.  Within a year, the Board of Regents relented and the University of the Philippines adopted these classes by formally establishing the College of Law on January 12, 1911. The college was formally opened in with fifty (50) Filipino and American students.

Justice Sherman Moreland of the Philippine Supreme Court, the first acting Dean of the college, eventually declined to take on the position full-time.  He was thus replaced by Malcolm, who served until his appointment as an Associate Justice of the Philippine Supreme Court in 1917.

In 1964, the University of the Philippines Law Center was established as an agency attached to the college of law, the University of the Philippines Law Center was created to conduct continuing legal education programs, as well as legal research and publications.

In the 1960s up to the 1980s, the four-year law program consisted of one-hundred-twenty-two (122) units which emphasize the eight bar subjects listed in the Revised Rules of Court: civil law, criminal law, remedial law, legal ethics and legal forms, commercial law, political law, tax law, labor law, public corporation and public officers, and international law. The program also included non-bar subjects such as legal history, legal bibliography, statutory construction, jurisprudence, trial techniques, thesis and legal research, legal medicine, and practice court.

In addition to Philippine laws and jurisprudence, foreign legal materials from Spain, the United States and other Asian countries were integrated into the curriculum. Students were introduced to basic principles of Roman civil law, English common law, and other international legal systems.

In 1988, the college launched a core-elective curriculum, permitting law students to enroll up to twenty (20) percent of their total academic load for elective subjects. The effort was made to incorporate specializations in legal education. In 1989, the college followed a revised model law curriculum  adopted by the Philippine Department of Education. The program composed of 51 subjects (124 academic units) which took effect in 1990. It offered additional non-bar subjects such as legal profession, legal ethics, legal counselling, legal research, and legal writing.

In recognition of the college as "the country’s premier institution in providing quality legal education" and in honor of its "significant contributions to national development since it was founded in 1911," President Benigno Aquino III declared 2011 as the "University of the Philippines College of Law Centennial Year" and authorized, among others, the creation of commemorative stamps by the Philippine Postal Corporation.

Programs and admissions
The college first conferred the Juris Doctor (J.D.) on its April 2008 graduates, after a change in degree title was approved by the U.P. administration the previous year. Like the majority of law schools in the country, UP used to provide the Bachelor of Laws (LL.B.), a standard four-year law program covering all subjects in the bar exams, until the change to J.D. was made in order to reflect more accurately the U.P. law program being a "professional as well as a post baccalaureate degree." The college has relaunched its Master of Laws program in August 2019.

At an average of 8%, the college has the lowest admission rate among Philippine law schools. The criteria for admissions include the aggregate of weights assigned to an applicant's scores in the Law Aptitude Examination and undergraduate General Weighted Average (GWA), in addition to the scores obtained during an in-person interview with the admissions committee composed of faculty members.

Through the Law Center, the college conducts Mandatory Continuing Legal Education programs for the members of the Philippine Bar, consisting of a series of seminars on various aspects of the legal and judicial profession offered throughout the year. The college also hosts various conferences, fora, colloquia and workshops, which serve as formal and informal channels of communication, information, and education provided by the Law Center.

Rankings
UP Law has been ranked as "still the best law school in the Philippines" by the Legal Education Board in its ranking of top performing law schools in 2015 based on cumulative performance of law schools in the 2012, 2013 and 2014 Bar examinations. It was likewise the country's top performing law school, with a passing rate of 89.73%, in the 2015 bar exams.

Since 2019, UP Law is ranked 251-300 in the QS World University Rankings among all law schools in the world. It is the sole Philippine law school in the list.

Campuses

The UP Law Complex

Malcolm Hall

The main offices and classrooms of the college are located inside Malcolm Hall within the UP Diliman campus in Quezon City. The building is named after Associate Justice George Malcolm, who in 1911 became the first permanent dean of the college. The building itself, one of the oldest in the Diliman campus, was designed by the noted architect Juan M. Arellano. It was built under the supervision of the construction firm Pedro Siochi and Company. It was erected shortly before the Japanese invasion of the Philippines during World War II, but it was only after the University of the Philippines transferred its main campus to Diliman in 1948 that Malcolm Hall was actually used.

Malcolm Hall also houses the University of the Philippines Law Library, formally known as Espiritu Hall. It the largest academic law library in the country. It contains the largest and most up-to-date collection of Philippine legal materials as well as foreign statute and case books and various law journals. The library is open to U.P. law students and professors. It is also available to non-UP law students subject to proper identification and payment of library service fees.

Several of the classrooms in Malcolm Hall are named after prominent graduates and faculty members, such as Ambrosio Padilla, Bienvenido Ambion, and Violeta Calvo-Drilon. There is also an airconditioned moot court resembling the trial courts in the Philippines, a student lounge and an auditorium. Fronting the auditorium is the main lobby of Malcolm Hall. On its walls are inscribed a quotation from the American Supreme Court Justice Oliver Wendell Holmes Jr. –

THE BUSINESS OF LAW SCHOOL IS NOT 
SUFFICIENTLY DESCRIBED WHEN YOU MERELY
SAY THAT IT IS TO TEACH LAW OR TO MAKE
LAWYERS. IT IS TO TEACH LAW IN THE GRAND
 MANNER AND TO MAKE GREAT LAWYERS
- HOLMES                 

In 2013, a historical marker was unveiled at the façade of Malcolm Hall as part of the college's centennial celebrations. In his letter to the National Historical Commission, then dean Danilo Concepcion said that the marker was installed to “inscribe in stone” the “significance and impact of the U.P. College of Law to our country’s history as a nation.”

Bocobo Hall

Adjacent to Malcolm Hall is Bocobo Hall, which houses the University of the Philippines Law Center. The Law Center was established in 1964 as an agency attached to the College of Law, for the purpose of conducting continuing legal education programs, as well as legal research and publications. The Law Center is the university center for legal publishing, legal research, and law conferences. It is composed of 4 Institutes, namely, the Institute of Government and Law Reform, the Institute of Human Rights, the Institute of International Legal Studies, and the Institute of Judicial Administration. The Law Center also hosts the offices of the Office of the National Administrative Registrar, an agency of the Philippine government which registers all national government statutes and issuances.

To "popularize" the law, the Law Center conducts programs in legal literacy and street law ("practical law") in cooperation with non-governmental organizations (NGOs), student organizations, and the local barangays. Extension programs happen in the form of barangay legal education seminars to reach the grassroots level.

Henry Sy Sr. Hall
Henry Sy Sr. Hall opened in 2016 and houses the UP Bonifacio Global City campus. It serves as a satellite unit of UP Diliman. Located at the Bonifacio Global City district in Taguig, the campus hosts classes of the College of Law, and graduate courses and professional degree programs of other academic arms of UP Diliman, such as the Virata School of Business and the School of Statistics.

The nine-level structure is the 17th constituent unit of the UP System and was built at a cost of around P400 million through a donation by SM Investments. The campus building is named after Henry Sy, former chairman and CEO of SM Investments.

UP Visayas - Iloilo City
In September 2021, the college started offering extension classes at the Iloilo City campus of UP Visayas with a pioneer batch of 20 students.

Prominent alumni

UP Law graduated many leading figures in the country's political history, including former Philippine presidents Manuel A. Roxas, José P. Laurel, Elpidio Quirino, and Ferdinand E. Marcos; incumbent Senators Franklin Drilon, Sonny Angara, Koko Pimentel, Francis Pangilinan, Richard J. Gordon, and Pia Cayetano; and prominent jurists such as former chief justices Pedro Yap, Querube Makalintal, Enrique Fernando, Teresita de Castro, Maria Lourdes Sereno, Reynato S. Puno, Hilario Davide Jr., Marcelo B. Fernan, Ramon Aquino, Felix V. Makasiar, Fred Ruiz Castro, César Bengzon, Ricardo Paras, and José Yulo.

Organizations
The Philippine Law Journal, first published in 1914, is the official law review of the college. The Law Student Government is the official student government of the college, while the Bar Operations Commission is an independent constitutional body created in February 2009 that handles the holistic support system the college provides its bar candidates during the bar season.

Students who obtain a grade point average of at least 2.0 are inducted into the Order of the Purple Feather, the official honor society of the law college.

Among the student-organized organizations in the college are the Schola Juris Vespertina, composed of evening students, UP Women in Law, composed of female law students, and the Paralegal Volunteers Organization, composed of student volunteers who perform paralegal work for underprivileged and under-represented sectors of society.

Several fraternities and sororities operate within the college: the UP Portia Sorority (the only law-based sorority in UP), the UP Delta Lambda Sigma Sorority, Alpha Phi Beta fraternity, and the Sigma Rho fraternity. Other university-wide organizations that also operate and recruit within the college are Alpha Sigma Fraternity, Alpha Sigma Nu Sorority, Alpha Phi Omega, Pi Sigma Fraternity, UP Beta Sigma Fraternity, UP Vanguard Fraternity, and Upsilon Sigma Phi.

See also
Legal education in the Philippines

References

External links

University of the Philippines College of Law
University of the Philippines System

Law
Law
Law schools in the Philippines
Educational institutions established in 1911
1911 establishments in the Philippines